Grenville Anderson (26 November 1951 – 31 May 2004) was an Australian auto racing driver, considered one of the icons of Australian sedan racing. He is the only driver in Australian speedway history to win four Australian Super Sedan Championships.

He died on 31 May 2004 as a consequence of injuries he sustained at the then Archerfield Speedway, now Brisbane International Speedway, on 8 May 1993, some 11 years earlier. Anderson, who was running hot laps in practice for the 1993/94 Australian Championship for which he was the defending champion and favourite to win his fifth title, climbed the concrete wall between turns 1 and 2, and rode along the top of the wall for approximately 30 metres. As the wall ended into the pits his car flipped onto the right hand side and struck a concrete retaining wall on the driver's side with his head striking the wall. Questions were raised as to the chances of his injuries not being as severe if he had been wearing a purpose made racing helmet. Grenville preferred using a motocross style helmet over using the traditional style of racing helmet used at the time.

The Grenville Anderson East Coast National, a 50 lap race, is held annually in his honor at Lismore Speedway.

In 2007, Anderson was one of the first ten people inducted into the Australian Speedway Hall of Fame.

Australian Super Sedan Title
After spending over a decade not finishing on the Aussie title podium, Anderson was the class of the field in the 1991/92 title at Adelaide's Speedway Park, with most believing that only trouble in the Final would prevent him winning his fourth National crown. Unfortunately car trouble put him out halfway through the Final which was eventually won by reigning South Australian Champion and local Speedway Park hotshot Brad Scotcher. Anderson made up for his Adelaide failure the next year, winning his record fourth Australian Championship in Latrobe, Tasmania.

 Winner in 1975/76 at Rowley Park Speedway in Adelaide, South Australia
 Winner in 1977/78 at Claremont Speedway in Perth, Western Australia
 2nd  in 1978/79 at Charlton Raceway in Toowoomba, Queensland
 Winner in 1979/80 at Bagot Park in Darwin, Northern Territory
 Winner in 1992/93 at Latrobe Speedway in Latrobe, Tasmania

Winners of Grenville Anderson East Coast Grand National
2010 – Tania Smith driving a Danny Smith built Rocket racecar
2011 – Darren Kane driving the Ian Boettcher sponsored Dominator racecar

References

External links
 Grenville Anderson – The tributes pour in

1951 births
2004 deaths
People from New England (New South Wales)
Racing drivers from New South Wales
Place of birth missing